The Symphony No. 1 is a symphony for orchestra by the American composer Elliott Carter.  The work was originally completed in Santa Fe, New Mexico on December 18, 1942, though Carter later revised the work in 1954.  It was first performed on April 27, 1944, by the Eastman-Rochester Symphony under the direction of Howard Hanson at the fourteenth annual Festival of American Music.  The piece is dedicated to Carter's wife.

Composition
The Symphony has a duration of roughly 25 minutes and is composed in three movements:
Moderately, wistfully
Slowly, gravely
Vivaciously

Instrumentation
The work is scored for an orchestra comprising two flutes (second doubling piccolo), two oboes, two clarinets (first doubling E-flat clarinet), two bassoons, two horns, two trumpets, trombone, timpani, and strings.

Reception
The Symphony No. 1 has been praised by music critics.  Reviewing a 2003 recording of the work (among other Carter pieces), Arnold Whittall of Gramophone wrote:

References

Compositions by Elliott Carter
1942 compositions
Carter 1